The Shouchang River, also known as Ai Xi, is a 65.8-km-long river in Jiande, Zhejiang province, China. A tributary of the Xin'an River, it originates in the town of Lijia and passes through Datong, Hangtou, Shouchang (its namesake), Daciyan, Genglou Subdistrict, and Xin'anjiang Subdistrict. It has a drainage area of 692.3 km2.

References

Rivers of China
Rivers of Zhejiang
Jiande